Catherine Barclay and Émilie Loit were the defending champions, but Loit did not compete this year. Barclay teamed up with Ruxandra Dragomir Ilie and lost in the first round to Evgenia Kulikovskaya and Silvija Talaja.

Petra Mandula and Elena Tatarkova won the title by defeating Conchita Martínez Granados and Tatiana Perebiynis 6–3, 6–1 in the final.

Seeds

Draw

Draw

References

External links
 Official results archive (ITF)
 Official results archive (WTA)

Tippmix Budapest Grand Prix - Doubles
Budapest Grand Prix